Hyouka is a Japanese anime television series based on the Classic Literature Club series written by Honobu Yonezawa. It was named after the first volume of the series, Hyouka, and made into a 22-episode televised animation series. The story follows Houtarou Oreki, a first-year high school student who meets Eru Chitanda, Satoshi Fukube, and Mayaka Ibara after joining his school's Classic Literature Club. 

Hyouka was produced by Kyoto Animation, with directing by Yasuhiro Takemoto, series composition by Shoji Gatoh, and character design by Futoshi Nishiya. The opening theme played in the first half of the series was sung by ChouCho, and the opening played in the second half was sung by Saori Kodama. The ending theme of both parts of the series was sung by Satomi Satō and Ai Kayano. The main cast includes Yuichi Nakamura, playing Oreki, and Satomi Satō playing Chitanda. The story is set in Kamiyama, a fictional city based on Honobu Yonezawa's actual home city, Takayama.

The original 22 episodes were broadcast from April to September 2012. A bonus original video animation was streamed via Ustream in July 2012. A two-part Blu-ray edition was also released. Funimation licensed the series in North America, and following the acquisition of Crunchyroll by Sony, the series was moved to Crunchyroll. Hyouka was commended for its visual effects, and for being combining the genres of mystery and slice of life.

Synopsis  
Houtarou Oreki is a high school student of Kamiyama Senior High School. He tries to follow his motto of  'If I don't have to do something, I won't, but if I have to, I'll do it quickly,' and is a believer of the so-called 'energy conservatism'. However, his plan is somewhat disturbed when his sister forces him to join the school's Classic Literature Club, which is at the risk of being disbanded. Oreki joins the club along with Eru Chitanda, Satoshi Fukube, and Mayaka Ibara.

To Houtarou's dismay, Chitanda gets in the way of his 'energy conservatism' by asking Oreki to solve problems every time her curiosity arises. One day, Eru asks Houtarou to meet at a local cafe. Chitanda then reveals the reason she joined the club: her uncle, a former member of the club, went missing in India and is awaiting a funeral as he will soon be considered legally dead. She then says that she does not remember what her uncle said that put her in tears as a child, and asks Houtarou for his help. Houtarou reluctantly agrees. After further consideration, Eru asks the other members of the club to help out in the investigation. Houtarou, with evidence given by the rest of the members, reveals that Eru's uncle was expelled from the school against his will due to a school protest. He also reveals that the club's traditional anthology "Hyouka", is a pun: when it is translated into English it actually reads "I Scream" (Ice cream). This pun is a warning by Chitanda's uncle, where he wanted to tell future club members to voice their opinions.

With Eru's uncle's case resolved, the club members starts preparing their annual anthology, "Hyouka". However, they are interrupted by Eru's senior, Fuyumi Irisu. She asks the Classic Lit. Club, specifically Houtarou, to find the true ending of her class' (Class 2-F) independent film, whose author, Hongou, fell ill before completing the script. The two parties end up coming to an agreement that Class 2-F will come up with possible theories and evidence, while Oreki and his friends will make their own interpretation based on the theories given by Class 2-F. Houtarou comes up with the "true" ending of the story, and the movie is played successfully with positive responses. However, other members of the Club pose flaws in his theories, and as Houtarou investigates more, he discovers Irisu's true plan: Irisu never intended to find the "true" ending of the movie, but instead made a cover-up to make Houtarou the new author, since she thought that Hongou's script was too boring.

Soon after, the long-anticipated cultural festival, the "Kanya Festival", begins. The Classic Lit. Club prepares to sell the anthology "Hyouka". However, due to a misprint, they end up with 200 copies, instead of 30. Thus, the club members scramble to advertise their club by participating in school events. However, the club members soon realize strange robberies occurring throughout the school. A culprit by the name of "Juumonji" appears, robbing festival supplies from different clubs, in which after always leaving behind a note. Houtarou and the club begin to investigate, and realize that the robberies are taking place in alphabetical order, a mock crime of The A.B.C. Murders. Houtarou finds the culprit to be Jiro Tanabe, a member of the school's Executive Committee. Jiro tried to send a code to the school's Executive Committee President, Muneyoshi Kugayama, who has quit art and the project they were working on despite being talented, which angered him. Houtarou strikes a deal with Jiro to make the final event of "Juumonji" to advertise "Hyouka" in return of Houtarou keeping this fact a secret. Unfortunately, Kugayama is unable to decrypt this code and the incident is passed off as a funny prank.

Months pass and many events happen to the Oreki and his friends. In the New Year Festival, Houtarou and Eru end up getting trapped in a wooden hut but successfully escape after sending a message to Satoshi. On Valentine's Day, a chocolate Mayaka made for Satoshi is stolen. Houtarou realizes something about Satoshi and questions him about the incident, in which Satoshi reveals that he stole the chocolate due to his fear of developing strong feelings to Mayaka. Satoshi ends up calling Mayaka. As spring arrives, Eru asks Houtarou to join the Hinamatsuri, which is disturbed by a construction happening early on a bridge used in the festival. With the permission of the neighboring shrine, the route is changed and the Hinamatsuri ends successfully. Eru and Houtarou guesses that a young man changed the date of the construction to get better pictures of the festival. On the way home, Eru tells Houtarou that she wishes to stay in the quiet town. Houtarou tells her that he would like to help with her dream, but quickly stops and says the weather is cold. Eru replies that spring has already arrived, and a breeze blows through the cherry blossoms.

Characters

Production 

The television anime series Hyouka was animated by Kyoto Animation. Honobu Yonezawa provided the source material, being the original author of Hyouka and the adaptation consultant for the anime. Yonezawa also participated in the process of producing the animation, but as he believed that it was more important for Hyouka to be a good anime than a novel, he entrusted Shoji Gatoh and the studio for most of the work. The key staff included Yasuhiro Takemoto as director, Futoshi Nishiya as the character designer, Naomi Ishida as the color designer, Shuhei Okude as the art director, Ryuuta Nakagami as the cinematographer, Hiroshi Karada for setting, Kengo Shigemura as editor, Tsuruoka Yota as audio director, and Kohei Tanaka as the music composer. According to an interview with SakuraBlog, Yasuhiro Takemoto has volunteered to be the director for the series. The series' writer, Shoji Gatoh, was invited by Yasuhiro Takemoto to participate.

Hyouka is set in a fictional city called Kamiyama in Gifu Prefecture. This is based on Honobu Yonezawa's actual home city, Takayama. In 2018, the Anime Tourism Association included Takayama in the list of "88 sacred anime pilgrimage sites in Japan." 

Hyouka features several real-life locations in Takayama. The Kamiyama Senior High School, which appears in the opening and each episode, is based on Hida Senior High School. The Kajibashi bridge, which goes across the Miyagawa river, is also featured in the opening and Episode 18. The Miyagawa Morning Market Street is also featured in the opening. The Arekusujinja Shirne, featured in Episode 20 and the opening, is based on the Hiejinja shrine. Other sites include the Yaoihashi Bridge shown in the opening and Episodes 11 and 18, the Hirayu Onsen Hot Springs shown in Episode 7, the Takayama City Library (as Kamiyama City Library) in Episode 18, and the Minashi Shrine and Garyu Cherry Trees shown in Episode 22.

Hyouka aired 22 episodes from April 22 to September 15, 2012. An original video animation was streamed on Ustream on July 8, 2012. In March 2012, its PV was released. Its first episode was played on April 14, 2012, at Kadokawa Cinema in Shinjuku, as a special event. It aired in Japan starting from April 22 to September 16 of the same year. It also received a bonus original video animation, streaming on Ustream on July 8, 2012, and was re-released as a Blu-ray disk along with Hyouka's third manga volume. Funimation licensed the anime and released it on home media in North America on July 4, 2017, with an English dub. Funimation produced the English dubbed edition of Hyouka. Following the acquisition of Crunchyroll, the series was also moved to Crunchyroll. In South Korea, Mirage Entertainment produced a Korean dubbed home video edition of the series.

Music 
The anime features two openings and endings, each with its own theme music. The first opening theme, used for the first 11 episodes, is "Yasashisa no Riyū" (Reason of Kindness) by ChouCho. The first ending theme, used for the first 11 episodes, is the song "Madoromi no Yakusoku" (Promise of Slumber). The second opening theme used from episode 12 and onwards is "Mikansei Stride" (未完成ストライド, Unfinished Stride) which was sung by Saori Kodama. The second ending theme is "Kimi ni Matsuwaru Mystery" (Mystery Surrounding You). Both ending themes were sung by Satomi Satō and Ai Kayano.

Kohei Tanaka took charge of composing the music for Hyouka. Hyouka features a significant amount of classical music in its soundtrack, including Sicilienne by Fauré, and Air on the G String by Johann Sebastian Bach. Tanaka said in an interview that the use of classical music was requested by Honobu Yonezawa.

Hyouka's four themes were published as an album. The album for the first opening theme, "Yasashisa no Riyū", was released on May 2, 2012. The album for the first ending theme, "Madoromi no Yakusoku", was released on May 23, 2012. The album for the second opening theme, "Mikansei Stride", was released on August 8, 2012. The album for the second ending theme, "Kimi ni Matsuwaru Mystery", was released on August 22, 2012.

Episodes

Reception

Popularity
Hyouka was also ranked highly on a variety of lists. It was ranked 25th place in the "Best Anime 100" in an NHK poll. On BIGLOBE's Animeone, Hyouka was ranked 1st place in the 2012 Spring Anime category. It was also listed in Crunchyroll Editorial's top 100 anime of the decade.

Hyouka's Blu-ray BD box sold 8093 copies making it the 3rd most sold Blu-ray Disc in the week of February 23 – March 1, 2015.

Events 
Hyouka was used in marketing events for Gifu Prefecture and Takayama City. Gifu's Red Cross held an event where Hyouka posters were provided to those providing blood donations. Takayama City distributed 10,000 maps showing the real-life locations of Hyouka. The show was also featured in Takayama City's rice production, selling featured rice of the show. The Takayama Police produced wet tissues and clear files featuring Hyouka characters in crime prevention campaigns.

On April 22, 2022, Hyouka met its 10th Anniversary, and related projects were announced. Its 10th Anniversary logo and poster were released.  A museum for Hyouka took place in the GAMERS main store in Akihabara from May 25 to June 15, 2022. Kujibikido also partnered with Hyouka for an online lottery, providing goods to win. Ameba TV streamed the first 11 episodes of Hyouka on April 22, 2022, and Gifu Broadcasting System began rebroadcasting Hyouka starting from April 6, 2022.

Critical response
Hyouka's story was met with favourable reviews for its approach to the everyday aspect of the slice of life genre. Many critics complimented the level of detail to even the less important characters of the story, and also for the show's uniqueness in the mystery genre. THEM Anime Reviews pointed out that the show was unique in the field of mysteries for dealing with "trivial but always personal" mysteries, and Anime News Network's Paul Jensen noted Hyouka's uniqueness genre-wise, claiming that it was the only show combining mystery and slice of life in that way. However, some critics described the show as being "dull", and others pointed out that the show lacked unity and a sense of conclusion. 

Hyouka’s characters were also met with generally favourable reviews, although some critics, like Beveridge from The Fandom Post, found the characters in the show lifeless. Some critics found the characters unique, with some finding that the characters were "distinctive" and "slipping past" stereotypes. Anime News Network's Nick Creamer found that the character development reached "stunning dramatic peaks". The main characters were also met with favourable commentary, and some noted that the story's main female protagonist, Eru Chitanda, had a simple persona that drove the story while having the complexity and intelligence to make her more than a "plot device". The male protagonist of the show, Oreki, was complimented for being an entertaining character, with THEM Anime Reviews noting his wit and dynamic attempts to avoid doing anything. However, some critics criticized Oreki's character, with Beveridge describing him as an "absolute downer".

Critics commended Hyouka's art, with some describing it as "probably their (Kyoto Animation's) most beautiful series" and the "most beautiful television anime of all time." Many critics, including Beveridge, who was mostly negative about the show, complimented the show’s art for its technical aspects such as lighting and background.

References

External links
Official website 

2012 anime television series debuts
2012 Japanese television series endings
2013 anime OVAs
Anime based on novels
Crunchyroll anime
Kyoto Animation
Muse Communication
Mystery anime and manga
School life in anime and manga
Slice of life anime and manga